Natrona is an unincorporated community in central Natrona County, Wyoming, United States. It lies along the concurrent U.S. Routes 20 and 26, west of the city of Casper, the county seat of Natrona County.  Its elevation is 5,604 feet (1,708 m). Although Natrona is unincorporated, it has been assigned its own ZIP code of 82646.

History
Natrona contained a post office from 1906 until 1984. The community was named from its location in Natrona County.

References 

Unincorporated communities in Natrona County, Wyoming
Unincorporated communities in Wyoming